Apostolos Armenakis (born ) is a Greek male volleyball player. He was part of the Greece men's national volleyball team. On club level he played for Aurispa Alessano in 2014-15.

References

External links
 profile at FIVB.org

1980 births
Living people
Aris V.C. players
E.A. Patras players
Iraklis V.C. players
Greek men's volleyball players
Olympiacos S.C. players
Volleyball players from Thessaloniki
PAOK V.C. players